John William Thornley (19 September 1885 – 31 March 1918) was an English amateur footballer who played in the Football League for Glossop as a forward.

Personal life 
Thornley was born in September 1885 in Hayfield, Derbyshire to Thomas and Henrietta Thornley and was baptised the following March in Whitfield, Derbyshire. His elder brother Irvine was also a footballer. In 1915, during the second year of the First World War, Thornley enlisted as a private in the Cheshire Regiment. He was wounded at the Battle of St Quentin and died of his wounds on 31 March 1918. Thornley was buried in Wimereux Communal Cemetery.

References

1885 births
1918 deaths
English Football League players
British Army personnel of World War I
Glossop North End A.F.C. players
British military personnel killed in World War I
Association football forwards
Association football outside forwards
Cheshire Regiment soldiers
English footballers
People from Hayfield, Derbyshire
Footballers from Derbyshire
Military personnel from Derbyshire
Burials in France